The Cobourg Peninsula is located  east of Darwin in the Northern Territory, Australia. In the west, it is separated from Melville Island by Dundas Strait. In the north is the Arafura Sea, and in the south the Van Diemen Gulf.

Development
All of Cobourg Peninsula is part of Garig Gunak Barlu National Park, which also encompasses a few nearshore islands. Mostly a tourist attraction, it is known for its pristine wilderness. It is home to a large variety of sea life and the world's largest herd of pure-strain banteng (wild cattle). It is also renowned for its Aboriginal culture. While it is only sparsely inhabited today, it was once the site of two failed attempts at founding a major trading port on its northern shores, Fort Wellington at Raffles Bay (1827-1829) and Fort Victoria at Port Essington (1838-1849), the ruins of which are still accessible today.

Settlement
There are no notable settlements or villages on Cobourg Peninsula, just a few family outstations and other establishments along or close to the north coast, from west to east:

 Cape Don Light (lighthouse)
 Cape Don Airport (ICAO Code YCPD) (grass airfield 1800 m, opened 8 Nov 1989)
Araru Point (Araru) (family outstation)
Ardbinae (Adbanae, Trepang Bay) (family outstation)
 Port Essington (Victoria Settlement) (former European settlement)
Gumuragi (Gumeragi, Reef Point) (family outstation)
Algarlalgari (Black Point) (ranger station)
Ngardimardi (Smith Point) (camping area)
Gul Gul (Danger Point) (abandoned family outstation, ruins)
Meriah (Mariah, Raffles Bay) (family outstation)
Irgul (Irgul Point) (family outstation)

The closest village is Minjilang on Croker Island close east.

See also 
 Garig Gunak Barlu National Park

References 

 
Ramsar sites in Australia
Arnhem Land tropical savanna